Sir James Fergusson, 6th Baronet  (14 March 1832 – 14 January 1907) was a British soldier, Conservative politician and colonial administrator.

Background and education
Born in Edinburgh, Scotland, Fergusson was the eldest son of Sir Charles Fergusson, 5th Baronet, and his wife Helen, daughter of David Boyle. He was educated at Cheam, Rugby, and University College, Oxford (although he left without taking a degree). He entered the Grenadier Guards in 1851 and served in the Crimean War where he was wounded. He retired from the army in 1859.

Political and administrative career
Fergusson was elected Member of Parliament for Ayrshire and represented the constituency in parliament from 1854 to 1857 and 1859 to 1868. He was Under-Secretary of State for India under Lord Derby from 1866 to 1867 and Under-Secretary of State for the Home Department from 1867 to 1868 under Derby and Benjamin Disraeli and was admitted to the Privy Council in 1868.

Fergusson served as Governor of South Australia from 1868. In November 1872 he was appointed governor of New Zealand and left Adelaide on 6 December for a short visit to England before taking up the post.

He was Governor of New Zealand between 1873 and 1874, when he resigned and returned to England.

He was appointed a Knight Commander of the Order of St Michael and St George in 1874.

He was appointed to a Royal Commission to inquire into the operation of the Factory and Workshop Acts in 1875, and to a Commission inquiring into the sale of liquor in Scotland in 1877.

He was Governor of Bombay between 1880 and 1885.

He was appointed an Extra Knight Grand Commander of the Order of the Star of India in 1885.

Following his retirement, he returned to the House of Commons, as Member of Parliament for Manchester North East, which he represented between 1885 and 1906. He again held political office as Under-Secretary of State for Foreign Affairs between 1886 and 1891 and as Postmaster General between 1891 and 1892 in Lord Salisbury's Conservative administration.

Family

Fergusson married firstly Lady Edith Christian, daughter of James Broun-Ramsay, 1st Marquess of Dalhousie, in 1859. They had two sons and two daughters. Lady Edith died on 20 October 1871 in Port Adelaide in Australia, aged 32. She was buried at North Road Cemetery in Adelaide. There is a memorial headstone in the north-west corner of the first western extension to Inveresk churchyard in Scotland.

Fergusson married secondly Olive, daughter of John Henry Richman, in 1873. Olive was born in South Australia, and they were married soon after arriving in New Zealand. They had one son. She died of cholera in January 1882.

He married thirdly Isabella Elizabeth, daughter of Richard Twysden and widow of Charles Hugh Hoare, in 1893. They had no children. Fergusson's son Charles and grandson Bernard Fergusson both became Governors-General of New Zealand.

Fergusson was killed in an earthquake in Jamaica in 1907, aged 74.

Legacy
The town of Jamestown and the County of Fergusson in South Australia, Fergusson Island in Papua New Guinea and Fergusson College in Pune (in his day, Poona), India are named in Fergusson's honour.

Arms

Notes

References
Newspaper report 1897
New Zealand Governor biography

External links 

 

1832 births
1907 deaths
Deaths in earthquakes
Politicians from Edinburgh
Grenadier Guards officers
British Army personnel of the Crimean War
James
Deputy Lieutenants of Ayrshire
6
Governors of South Australia
Governors of the Colony of South Australia
Governors-General of New Zealand
Governors of Bombay
Scottish Presbyterians
Members of the Parliament of the United Kingdom for Scottish constituencies
Members of the Parliament of the United Kingdom for English constituencies
Knights Grand Commander of the Order of the Star of India
Knights Commander of the Order of St Michael and St George
Members of the Privy Council of the United Kingdom
People educated at Cheam School
People educated at Rugby School
Alumni of University College, Oxford
United Kingdom Postmasters General
UK MPs 1852–1857
UK MPs 1859–1865
UK MPs 1865–1868
Members of the Bombay Legislative Council
British colonial governors and administrators in Oceania